Nederlands Dagblad ("Dutch Daily") is a Dutch daily newspaper, available nationwide, with a daily circulation of 23,800 issues (in 2020).

History
The paper was founded in 1944 as a semi-resistance paper during World War II called Reformatie Stemmen (Reformatory Voices). After the war it was renamed De Vrije Kerk (The Free Church) and later Gereformeerd gezinsblad (Reformed Family Paper). In 1959 it became a daily newspaper. 
The paper obtained its current name in 1967. For many years it had a strong binding with the Reformed Churches in the Netherlands (Liberated) and the Gereformeerd Politiek Verbond, a former Dutch christian political party. In recent years, it attempts to offer a broader perspective on contemporary issues from a Christian point of view.
The office is located in Amersfoort.

Circulation
On its top the circulation was about 32,000 in 2000. In 2020 the circulation is 23,800. Nederlands Dagblad reaches daily about 100,000 people (13+). The website, www.nd.nl, has monthly 470,000 unique visitors. Since 2011 most articles on the website are behind a pay wall.

Chief editors
 1948: Piet Jongeling
 1974: Jurn de Vries
 1994: Peter Bergwerff
 2013: Sjirk Kuijper

Trivia
In 2010 the size went from broadsheet (597 mm x 749 mm) to berliner (315 mm x 470 mm). Since 2015 the size is tabloid (279 mm x 432 mm) like most Dutch newspapers.

The typeface Gulliver, created in 1992 by Gerard Unger, is the main typeface used in Nederlands Dagblad.

References

External links
 
 

Daily newspapers published in the Netherlands
Dutch-language newspapers
Publications established in 1944